The following list is a discography of production by Howard Benson, a Grammy Award-nominated record producer.

Discography

References 

Production discographies